George Ciamba (February 20, 1966 – July 11, 2021) was a Romanian diplomat who served, from November 2018 to November 2019, as the Romanian Minister for European Affairs, including during Romania's 2019 first presidency of the Council of the European Union.

Diplomatic career 
From 1999 to 2003, he was ambassador to Turkey and Permanent Representative of Romania to the Black Sea Economic Cooperation Organization. He was ambassador to Greece from 2005 to 2012.

Term as Minister for European Affairs and Romania's first Presidency of the Council of the European Union 
George Ciamba served as Minister for European Affairs during Romania's first presidency of the Council of the European Union.

Romania's first Presidency of the Council of the European Union

Romania took over the rotating presidency of the Council of the European Union, from January until June 2019, the first occasion since its EU accession. The motto of the Romanian Presidency was 'Cohesion, a Common European Value'.

It was preceded at the helm of the Council of the EU by Austria (July-December 2018) and succeeded by Finland (July-December 2019).

Member states holding the presidency work together closely in groups of three, called 'trios'. Romania was part of the Trio format alongside Finland and Croatia.

Results 
During the Romanian Presidency of the Council of the EU, approximately 2,500 meetings and events were organized: the Sibiu Summit, over 2,000 meetings of working groups, 64 EU Council ministerial meetings, and a total of 300 events which were held in Romania.

90 legislative files were closed in a record time of three months, by the end of European Parliament's legislative activity - on average, one file per day. 84 EU Council Conclusions were adopted on multiple topics of common interest, numerous Progress Reports of the Presidency were developed, and a number of Council Decisions were approved.

Distinctions

 2012: Order of the Phoenix – Grand Cross Grade - awarded by the President of the Hellenic Republic.
2000: National Order of Merit in the Rank of Commander - awarded by the President of Romania.
1999: Romanian Ambassador of the Year, Romanian Daily Nine O'clock.

References

External links

1966 births
2021 deaths
Ambassadors of Romania to Turkey
Ambassadors of Romania to Greece
People from Bucharest